Kendall Odell Montgomery (born July 27, 1992) is an American football defensive lineman who is currently a free agent. He played college football at Bowling Green State University and attended Monsignor Pace High School in Miami Gardens, Florida. He has been a member of the Miami Dolphins, Ottawa Redblacks, Saskatchewan Roughriders and Tampa Bay Storm.

Early life
Montgomery attended Monsignor Pace High School.

College career
Montgomery played for the Bowling Green Falcons from 2010 to 2014. Montgomery played in 50 games and helped the Falcons to 31 wins. He played in 44 games during his career, including 6 starts at tight end.

Professional career

Miami Dolphins
Montgomery signed with the Miami Dolphins as an undrafted free agent in May 2015. Montgomery played three preseason games for the Dolphins before he was released on August 30, 2015.

Ottawa Redblacks
On February 19, 2016, Montgomery signed with the Ottawa Redblacks of the Canadian Football League. He was released on June 26, 2016.

Saskatchewan Roughriders
Montgomery was signed to the Saskatchewan Roughriders' practice roster on October 18, 2016. He was released by the team on October 25, 2016.

Tampa Bay Storm
On April 13, 2017, Montgomery was assigned to the Tampa Bay Storm. The Storm folded in December 2017.

Baltimore Brigade
On March 20, 2018, Montgomery was assigned to the Baltimore Brigade.

References

External links
 Bowling Green Falcons bio

Living people
1992 births
Players of American football from Miami
Monsignor Edward Pace High School alumni
American football defensive linemen
Canadian football defensive linemen
American players of Canadian football
Bowling Green Falcons football players
Ottawa Redblacks players
Saskatchewan Roughriders players
Tampa Bay Storm players
Miami Dolphins players
Baltimore Brigade players
Players of Canadian football from Miami